Edward Roffe Thompson, who wrote as E.T. Raymond or Edward Raymond Thompson, (27 December 1891 – 13 October 1973) was an English author and journalist. He was the editor of John Bull magazine and wrote a number of biographies of British political figures and celebrities. He wrote an early self-help book, The Human Machine: Secrets of Success (1925).

Early life
Edward Thompson was born in Settle, Yorkshire, on 27 December 1891, the son of Edward Charles Thompson, a foreman store keeper. He received his higher education at the Victoria University of Manchester.

He married Caroline Alice (C. A.) Lejeune (1897–1973), a film reviewer for The Observer, in Chelsea in 1925 and they settled in Pinner Hill in Middlesex where they built a house on open fields. They had a son, the writer and broadcaster Anthony Lejeune (1928–2018). Edward was usually known as Roffe rather than Edward in private life.

Career
Thompson wrote for and was the editor of John Bull magazine in succession to Horatio Bottomley. He produced a number of biographies of British political figures and celebrities, and an early self-help book, The Human Machine: Secrets of Success (1925).

Death
Thompson died in Harrow, Middlesex, on 13 October 1973. His residence at the time of his death was Lane End, Hillside Road, Pinner. He left an estate of £32,735.

Selected publications
 Uncensored Celebrities. T. Fisher Unwin, London, 1918.
 All & Sundry. T. Fisher Unwin, London, 1919.
 Mr Balfour: A Biography. Collins, London, 1920.
 Portraits of the Nineties. T. Fisher Unwin, London, 1921.
 Mr. Lloyd George: A Biography. W. Collins, 1922.
 The Man of Promise: Lord Rosebery: A Critical Study. London, c. 1923.
 Disraeli: The Alien Patriot. Hodder and Stoughton, London, 1925.
 The Human Machine: Secrets of Success. Mills & Boon, London, 1925.
 Portraits of the New Century: (The first ten years). Ernest Benn, London, 1928.
 Life's Secrets. The Human Machine. Second Series. Peppercorn Press, London, 1931.

References

External links 
Online Books by E. T. Raymond.

1891 births
1973 deaths
People from Settle, North Yorkshire
Alumni of the Victoria University of Manchester
Self-help writers
English journalists
English biographers
English self-help writers
English magazine editors